Kirsten Welsh (born 1997) is a Canadian ice hockey official, currently serving as a linesman in the American Hockey League (AHL) and Ontario Hockey League (OHL). A retired ice hockey defenceman, she played college ice hockey with the Robert Morris Colonials in the College Hockey America (CHA) conference of the NCAA Division 1 during 2015 to 2019.

Officiating career
In September 2019, Welsh became one of four women to officiate at the NHL level for the first time, working in an NHL Prospect Tournament hosted by the Buffalo Sabres at the HARBORcenter from September 7 through 10.

Welsh was also joined by Kelly Cooke, Katie Guay, and Kendall Hanley as officials who worked the Elite Women's 3-on-3 event at the 2020 National Hockey League All-Star Game at Enterprise Center in St. Louis. Of note, Cooke and Guay served in the capacity of referees, while Hanley and Welsh were the linesmen.

Awards and honors
CHA
 2015–16 CHA All-Tournament Team
 2016–17 All-CHA First Team
 2017–18 All-CHA First Team
 2017–18 CHA Defender of the Year

USCHO
 2015–16 All-USCHO Rookie Team
Sources:

References

External links
 

Living people
1997 births
Canadian ice hockey officials
Canadian women's ice hockey forwards
Canadian expatriate ice hockey people in the United States
Canadian expatriate ice hockey players in the United States
Ice hockey people from Ontario
National Hockey League officials
Robert Morris Colonials women's ice hockey players